Kissy Chandiramani Ramesh  (born 8 March  1979) is a Spanish politician from Ceuta. A member of the Ceuta's autonomous government, she briefly served as MP in the Congress of Deputies in 2019 as part of the People's Party (PP) parliamentary group.

Biography 
Born in Ceuta on 8 March 1979, she is a member of the Ceuta's Hindu community. She earned a licentiate degree in law from Universidad CEU San Pablo and acquired another degree in EU law from Sorbonne. She worked as clerk in a law firm and as salesperson in a BBVA office. After running 12th in the People's Party (PP) list for the 2003 Ceuta local election, she became a member of the Assembly of Ceuta in 2003. She became minister of Economy, Finance and Public Function of the autonomous government of Ceuta in 2017. She was then referred as the "first member of the Congress of Deputies of Hindu origin". She took office again as minister of Economy, Finance and Public Function of the autonomous government of Ceuta in March 2020.

References 

Living people
1979 births
Members of the 12th Congress of Deputies (Spain)
Members of the Assembly of Ceuta
Government of Ceuta
People's Party (Spain) politicians